Anisoscelis is a genus of leaf-footed bugs in the family Coreidae. There are about 11 described species in the genus Anisoscelis.

Species
These 11 species belong to the genus Anisoscelis:
 Anisoscelis affinis Westwood, 1840 (flag-footed bug)
 Anisoscelis alipes Guérin-Méneville, 1833
 Anisoscelis caeruleipennis Guérin-Méneville, 1838
 Anisoscelis discolor Stål, 1854
 Anisoscelis foliaceus Fabricius, 1803
 Anisoscelis gradadius Distant, 1881
 Anisoscelis hymenipherus Westwood, 1840
 Anisoscelis luridus Brailovsky, 2016
 Anisoscelis marginellus Dallas, 1852
 Anisoscelis podalicus Brailovsky & Mayorga, 1995
 Anisoscelis scutellaris Stål, 1870
6 of these species (affinis, alipes, gradadius, hymenipherus, luridus, and podalicus) are part of subgenus Bitta while one species (caeruleipennis) is a disputed member of the Anisoscelis genus.

References

Further reading

External links

 

Articles created by Qbugbot
Anisoscelidini
Coreidae genera